Jeon Hyeon-chul (born 3 July 1990) is a South Korean footballer who plays as a forward for Daegu FC.

Club career statistics
As of 17 July 2017

External links 

1990 births
Living people
South Korean footballers
Association football forwards
Seongnam FC players
Jeonnam Dragons players
Busan IPark players
Daegu FC players
K League 1 players
K League 2 players
Ajou University alumni